ATP synthase subunit b, mitochondrial is an enzyme that in humans is encoded by the ATP5PB gene.

This gene encodes a subunit of mitochondrial ATP synthase. Mitochondrial ATP synthase catalyzes ATP synthesis, utilizing an electrochemical gradient of protons across the inner membrane during oxidative phosphorylation. ATP synthase is composed of two linked multi-subunit complexes: the soluble catalytic core, F1, and the membrane-spanning component, Fo, comprising the proton channel. The catalytic portion of mitochondrial ATP synthase consists of 5 different subunits (alpha, beta, gamma, delta, and epsilon) assembled with a stoichiometry of 3 alpha, 3 beta, and a single representative of the other 3. The proton channel seems to have nine subunits (a, b, c, d, e, f, g, F6 and 8). This gene encodes the b subunit of the proton channel.

The b subunits are part of the peripheral stalk that links the F1 and FO complexes together, and which acts as a stator to prevent certain subunits from rotating with the central rotary element. The peripheral stalk differs in subunit composition between mitochondrial, chloroplast and bacterial F-ATPases. In bacterial and chloroplast F-ATPases, the peripheral stalk is composed of one copy of the delta subunit (homologous to OSCP in mitochondria), and two copies of subunit b in bacteria, or one copy each of subunits b and b' in chloroplasts and photosynthetic bacteria.

References

External links

Further reading

Enzymes
Genes